Pascale Verbauwen (born 10 April 1963) is a Belgian freestyle swimmer. She competed in four events at the 1980 Summer Olympics.

References

External links
 

1963 births
Living people
Belgian female freestyle swimmers
Olympic swimmers of Belgium
Swimmers at the 1980 Summer Olympics
Sportspeople from Ghent